St Antony's Roman Catholic School is a coeducational Roman Catholic secondary school in Urmston, Greater Manchester, England.

The school was formed in 1992 from the merger of three Catholic secondary schools; St Mary's, Stretford, which opened in 1952, Cardinal Vaughan, Stretford, which opened in 1964, and St Paul's, Urmston, in whose modernised buildings St Antony's was established.

Notable former pupils

St. Mary's Secondary Modern School
 Morrissey, former singer of The Smiths in the 1980s
 Tyler Blackett, former player for Manchester United

References

External links
St Antony's Roman Catholic School official website

Secondary schools in Trafford
Catholic secondary schools in the Diocese of Salford
Academies in Trafford